Insulated pipes (called also preinsulated pipes or bonded pipe ) are widely used for district heating and hot water supply. They consist of a steel pipe called "service pipe", a thermal insulation layer and an outer casing. The insulation bonds the service pipe and the casing together. The main purpose of such pipes is to maintain the temperature of the fluid inside the service pipes. Insulated pipes are commonly used for transport of hot water from district heating plants to district heating networks and for distribution of hot water inside district heating networks.

Thermal insulation material usually used is polyurethane foam or similar, with a thermal conductivity λ50 of about 0.024–0.033 W/(m·K). 
While polyurethane has outstanding mechanical and thermal properties, the high toxicity of the [diisocyanates] required for its manufacturing has caused a restriction on their use. This has triggered research on alternative insulating foam fitting the application, which include polyethylene terephthalate (PET)  and polybutylene (PB-1).
The outer casing is usually made of high-density polyethylene (HDPE). 
Preinsulated pipes for district heating are described in European standards EN 253 and EN 15698-1. EN 253 describes "District heating pipes - Bonded single pipe systems for directly buried hot water networks - Factory made pipe assembly of steel service pipe, polyurethane thermal insulation and a casing of polyethylene". EN 15698-1 describes "District heating pipes - Bonded twin pipe systems for directly buried hot water networks - Factory made twin pipe assembly of steel service pipes, polyurethane thermal insulation and one casing of polyethylene". Both standards don't give "short names" or abbreviations for described pipes.

Thermal conductivity λ50 in unaged condition shall not exceed 0.029 W/(m·K). Both standards describe three insulation thickness levels. Both standards require use of polyurethane foam for thermal insulation and HDPE for casing.

See also

 Heat conduction
 Heat transfer
 Heat transfer mechanisms
 R-value
 Specific Heat
 Thermal bridge
 Thermal contact conductance
 Thermal diffusivity
 Thermal resistance in electronics
 Thermocouple

References 

Energy conservation
Heating, ventilation, and air conditioning
Piping
Residential heating

de:Kunststoffmantelverbundrohr